Chloroclystis elaeopa is a moth in the family Geometridae. It was described by Alfred Jefferis Turner in 1908. It is found in Queensland, Australia.

Adults have brown patterned wings. There is a dark mark near the centre of the forewing.

References

External links

Moths described in 1908
elaeopa
Moths of Australia